Truist Plaza is a  60 story skyscraper in downtown Atlanta. It was designed by John C. Portman, Jr. of John Portman & Associates and built from 1989 to 1992. In the mid-1990s, Portman sold half of his interest in the building to SunTrust Banks, which then moved its headquarters to the building and prompted a name change from One Peachtree Center to SunTrust Plaza. In 2021 the building changed its name to Truist Plaza, following a merger between SunTrust Banks and BB&T. The building is also known as 303 Peachtree. The building has a roof height of 871 feet (265 m) and stands a total of 902 feet (275 m) tall, including its antenna. When completed, Truist Plaza stood as the world's 28th tallest building and 21st tallest building in the United States. It is currently the 55th tallest building in the United States and 2nd tallest building in Atlanta.

History
Architect and developer John C. Portman, Jr. originally conceived this building in the 1980s commercial real-estate frenzy as a speculative office building.  Its basic design elements, a postmodern square tower with an elaborate base and crown, represented a departure for Portman from his earlier International-style work, and are said to have been inspired by Philip Johnson's wildly successful design for midtown Atlanta's One Atlantic Center.

Ground broke in 1989 with great fanfare, but by completion in 1992, the bottom had fallen out of Atlanta's real estate market and the building sat largely empty, nearly forcing Portman into bankruptcy and causing him to lose control of most of his real estate holdings. His architectural firm, John Portman & Associates, located their headquarters in the building.

The two-level lobby is filled with many works of art, sculpture and furniture designed by John Portman. The light rotates.

Recent events
The building was one of several struck by the mid-March 2008 Atlanta tornado, however it did not sustain damage as severe as most of the other buildings just south of it.  Several offices had to be temporarily relocated within the building due to broken windows.

LPTV station WDTA-LD relocated to the top of the building, from the even-taller Bank of America Plaza.  Despite long being Atlanta's second-tallest skyscraper, this is its first broadcast antenna.

The building has been since its construction the home of John Portman & Associates Architects.

Atlanta's Truist Plaza building is home to a peregrine falcons' nest in planters on a balcony more than 50 stories above ground. High above any natural predators, the planters offer soft substrate and afford some protection from harsh weather.  Peregrine falcons have been nesting at Truist Plaza since 1997. This Georgia Department of Natural Resources' Wildlife Resources Division web-camera offers viewers a unique look at the peregrines nesting activities in real-time.  (Note: The balcony is private and not open to the public.)

In October 2021, Truist announced plans to install signage on the crown of the building. The new signage was installed on January 23, 2022, which necessitated the closure of streets and sidewalks surrounding the skyscraper.

Gallery

See also
 List of tallest buildings in Atlanta
 List of tallest buildings in the United States

References

External links
 Truist Plaza Official website

Office buildings completed in 1992
Bank company headquarters in the United States
Office buildings in Atlanta
John C. Portman Jr. buildings
World Trade Centers
Postmodern architecture in the United States
Skyscraper office buildings in Atlanta